Álex López Morón (born 28 November 1970) is a retired professional male tennis player from Spain. His career-high ATP Entry ranking is No. 100 (achieved on 9 October 1995).

Career
He turned pro in 1990.

ATP career finals

Doubles: 2 (2 titles)

ATP Challenger and ITF Futures finals

Singles: 4 (2–2)

Doubles: 33 (16–17)

Performance timelines

Singles

Doubles

Wins over top 10 players

Personal life
His brother Víctor also played tennis professionally.

External links
 
 

1970 births
Living people
Tennis players from Catalonia
Spanish male tennis players
Tennis players from Barcelona